The tenth season of The Real Housewives of Atlanta, an American reality television series, is broadcast on Bravo premiered on November 5, 2017, and concluded on April 29, 2018, and was primarily filmed in Atlanta, Georgia. Its executive producers are Steven Weinstock, Glenda Hersh, Lauren Eskelin, Lorraine Haughton-Lawson, Luke Neslage, Anne Swan, Anthony Sylvester, and Andy Cohen.

The Real Housewives of Atlanta focuses on the lives of Nene Leakes, Shereé Whitfield, Kandi Burruss, Cynthia Bailey, Kenya Moore and Porsha Williams. 

This season marked the final appearance of Kim Zolciak-Biermann.

Production and crew 
In April 2017, the series was renewed for its tenth season. The tenth season was officially announced in September 2017, with a premiere of November 5, 2017. Executives producer for the season include: Steven Weinstock, Glenda Hersh, Lauren Eskelin, Lorraine Haughton-Lawson, Luke Neslage, Anne Swan, Anthony Sylvester and Andy Cohen.

Cast 
In June 2017, after the series' renewal, Nene Leakes announced she would return as a full-time housewife, following her departure following the seventh-season finale. In July, former housewife Kim Zolciak-Biermann announced she would return to the series in a recurring capacity, alongside newcomer Eva Marcille and Marlo Hampton returning in a recurring capacity. In September 2017, upon the announcement of the tenth season, it was announced that all of the housewives from the previous season, alongside the previously announced Leakes, would return as full-time housewives, with an exclusion of Phaedra Parks. Shamea Morton made numerous appearances throughout the season, along with original cast member, Lisa Wu.

 During her appearance at the reunion, Zolciak-Biermann replaces Williams and sits next Andy. Williams, Bailey, and Moore all move down a seat so she can be seated.
 Hampton and Marcille sit and the end of the right couch next to Whitfield during their appearances at the reunion.

Episodes

References

External links

2017 American television seasons
2018 American television seasons
The Real Housewives of Atlanta
Atlanta (season 10)